Maple Grove is an unincorporated community in Longswamp Township in Berks County, Pennsylvania, United States. Maple Grove is located near the intersection of State Street and Mountain Road.

References

Unincorporated communities in Berks County, Pennsylvania
Unincorporated communities in Pennsylvania